Helastia angusta is a moth of the family Geometridae. This species is endemic to New Zealand. It is classified as "At Risk, Relict'" by the Department of Conservation.

Taxonomy 
This species was first described by Robin C. Craw in 1987 using a specimen collected by John S. Dugdale at Moke Lake. The holotype specimen is held at the New Zealand Arthropod Collection.

Description
Craw described the species as follows:
Although similar in appearance to its relative H. expolita, H.angusta can be distinguished by its narrower forewing and the more rounded appearance of its underside basal line.

Distribution
This species is endemic to New Zealand. It occurs in the Otago Lakes and Mackenzie areas.

Host species and habitat 
The host species for the larvae of H. angusta is unknown but it has been hypothesised it may be a shrub species. Moth species closely related to H. angusta have larvae that feed Helichrysum lanceolatum.

Conservation status 
This moth is classified under the New Zealand Threat Classification system as being "At Risk, Relict".

References

Moths of New Zealand
Endemic fauna of New Zealand
Moths described in 1987
Cidariini
Endangered biota of New Zealand
Endemic moths of New Zealand